Perris–Downtown, also known as the Perris Station Transit Center, is a transport hub in Perris, California, that opened on January 11, 2010, with an eight-bay bus platform used by the Riverside Transit Agency. Train service to the station began on June 6, 2016, with the Perris Valley Line extension of the Metrolink commuter rail system. It is located near the historic Perris Depot.

Station history 

From 1892 to 1947, passenger service was provided by the Atchison, Topeka and Santa Fe Railway. Service ceased due to decrease in ridership. Freight service continued on the line until development replaced the farmland in the area. Proposals to return passenger service to Perris was first proposed in the 1990s

Planning was formalized in the form of an commuter rail station in the early 2010s. The bus portion of the station opened in January 2010, at the time, rail service was to start in late 2011, this was later postponed indefinitely. The rail plan was approved on January 16, 2013 At the time, it was reported that service would start in 2014, but that was pushed back by nearly two years. Train service finally began on June 6, 2016, marking the first regularly scheduled passenger train to arrive in Perris in nearly 59 years.

Services

Rail 

In addition to the main platform, a track pocket will be constructed to allow trains from the Southern California Railway Museum to turn around. Construction will begin when funding permits.

Bus 
The Riverside Transit Agency (RTA), which operates a network of buses around the Inland Empire, uses the eight bay bus platform at the station as a regional hub.  the station is served by RTA routes 9, 19, 22, 27, 28, 30, 61 and 74.

References

External links 

Metrolink stations in Riverside County, California
2016 establishments in California
Perris, California
Railway stations in the United States opened in 2016
Amtrak Thruway Motorcoach stations in California